East Park of Isfahan or Eshragh Park is a regional park in the area of Nakhodi Mountain located in the eastern part of Isfahan has various natural attractions and is a government tourism project under construction. The project is in District 4 under Isfahan Municipality domain, phase 1 of the project is 30 thousand meters square, built at a cost of 2500 million tomans, The 1st phase includes parking , green spaces, bicycle track, rest rooms, 2nd phase includes pavements, amphitheater, and parks that are now under digging stage.The 3rd phase also has Dolphin Park, zip-line, and some other exciting recreations.This mountain park provides vital 40% of city clean air with a combined 1400 hectares of green space.

References

Isfahan
Parks in Iran